James Meechan (born 17 August 1930) is a Scottish-Canadian artist best known for his stained glass work.

Biography 
Born in Glasgow, Scotland, during the Great Depression, Meechan attended Holyrood Secondary School before moving on to the Glasgow School of Art where he specialised in stained glass. He received commissions for windows from a number of churches in Scotland.  

In 1953, he emigrated to Canada, settling in Toronto. He married Kay Hanlon in 1954. Meechan received more window commissions from churches in Canada. To supplement his earnings from stained glass, and to support a growing family, he qualified as a secondary school teacher in the province of Ontario.  For a number of years he worked at Central Technical School, alongside Canadian artist Doris McCarthy. Meechan played a key role in the students' creation of the colossal ketchup bottle in 1967, built to poke fun at Claes Oldenburg's giant hamburger which was then on display at the Art Gallery of Ontario. 

Most of Meechan's career as a teacher was spent at C. W. Jefferys Collegiate Institute, where he was the Head of the Art Department from 1970, when the school was established, until 1986.  Meechan continued to receive commissions for stained glass windows after that time. The subjects of his windows, understandably, have usually been religious. The subjects of his watercolours, however, have often included the shore of Lake Huron near Southampton, Ontario.

James Meechan is a Life Member of the Ontario Society of Artists, having joined in 1966.

References

1930 births
Living people
Alumni of the Glasgow School of Art
Artists from Glasgow
20th-century Canadian painters
Canadian male painters
21st-century Canadian painters
Canadian stained glass artists and manufacturers
People educated at Holyrood Secondary School
20th-century Canadian male artists
21st-century Canadian male artists